Dolla is a four-member Malaysian girl group formed in 2019 by Universal Music Malaysia. Its members consists of Sabronzo, Tabby, Angel, and Syasya. The group is known for their vocal, dance & rap elements in their performances. They signed a contract with Universal Music Malaysia and released their debut single "Dolla Make You Wanna" on 20 March 2020. The group fandom is called "iDolla"

Career
Dolla was formed in August 2019 through auditions. The members did not know each other prior to their auditions.

Dolla gained pre-debut public attention for their performance at the #RapstarEra Final, at The Bee Republika. On 20 March 2020, they released their debut single "Dolla Make You Wanna", produced by Australian composer and producer Bryan B, and written by Zamaera, Bryan B, Shou Raion, and Luca Sickta.

Dolla was one of seventeen Malaysian artists to collaborate with Universal Music Malaysia to produce the song, "#jangankeluar" (translation: "Don't Go Out), a hip hop song produced by Yonnyboii. The song was released as part of a public health appeal to remind Malaysians to keep to the Malaysian Government's Movement Control Order during the COVID-19 pandemic.

The group, along with their fellow Southeast Asian artists, collaborated on the song, "HEAL", produced by Star Music, a wholly owned subsidiary of ABS-CBN Corporation.

Dolla released "Impikan" and its English version, "Watch Me Glow" in October 2020. They released their third single, "Berani" in September 2021.

On 13 November 2021, Dolla was nominated for the 34th  Bintang Popular Berita Harian Awards as Most Popular Female New Artist and won in that category, making the group as the first all-female group to won the category. 

In February 2022, they released their single, "Bad" in Malay and English version. In the same month, they held their first showcase & released their first mini album consist of their previously released songs including Bad. Throughout the year, they released several collaboration songs with other artists such as Hael Husaini, Naim Daniel & Yonnyboii showcasing their different sides of musical genres.

Members
Sabronzo (Wan Sabrina Wan Rusli; born 7 March 1995 in Kuala Lumpur)
Tabby (Tabitha Ariel Lam Lianne; born 18 March 2000 in Kuala Lumpur)
 Angel (Angelina Chai Ka Ying; born 2 January 2001 in Kuching, Sarawak)
 Syasya (Noorsyasya Afiqah Shahrizal; born 15 January 2001 in Kuala Lumpur)

Discography

Extended plays

Singles

As lead artist

Other songs

Filmography

Awards and nominations

References

External links
 
 
 

Malaysian girl groups
Malaysian dance musicians
Musical groups established in 2019
2019 establishments in Malaysia